"E.R. (Emergency Room)" is a song by American R&B singer Joe. It was written by Dernst "D'Mile" Emile II, Norquon "Fats" Greg, and LaShawn Daniels for his seventh studio album Joe Thomas, New Man (2008), while production was helmed by D'Mile and Greg. Released as the album's lead single, it peaked at number 32 on the US Billboard Hot R&B/Hip-Hop Songs chart.

Charts

References

2008 singles
2008 songs
Joe (singer) songs
Songs written by D'Mile
Songs written by LaShawn Daniels